The 1948 Massachusetts general election was held on November 2, 1948, throughout Massachusetts. Primary elections took place on September 14.

Despite some Republican success at the federal level, the 1948 election was an historic victory for the Massachusetts Democratic Party. In the race for Governor, Republican incumbent Robert F. Bradford lost re-election to former Attorney General Paul Dever. Democrats swept the six statewide offices, defeating incumbents in five races, and took control of the Massachusetts House of Representatives for the first time since the American Civil War.

At the federal level, Harry Truman carried the state over Thomas Dewey in the presidential election, but Republican Leverett Saltonstall was re-elected to the United States Senate, and Republicans won eight of fourteen seats in the United States House of Representatives.

Governor

Republican Governor Robert F. Bradford was defeated by Democratic former Attorney General Paul Dever in a landslide.

Lieutenant Governor
In the race for lieutenant governor, Democratic Mayor of Worcester defeated incumbent Republican Arthur W. Coolidge.

Democratic primary

Candidates

Declared
Charles F. "Jeff" Sullivan, Mayor of Worcester
Benedict FitzGerald, attorney
Edward P. Barry

Results

General election

Secretary of the Commonwealth
Incumbent Republican Secretary of the Commonwealth Frederic W. Cook ran for re-election to a record fifteenth two-year term in office, but was narrowly defeated by Democrat Edward J. Cronin.

The Socialist Labor Party nominated Gote E. Palmquist.

Democratic primary

General election

Attorney General
Incumbent Republican Attorney General Clarence A. Barnes ran for re-election to a third consecutive term. He was defeated Democratic former Lt. Governor Francis E. Kelly in the general election. This was a re-match of the 1946 election.

Democratic primary

General election

Treasurer and Receiver-General
Incumbent Republican Treasurer and Receiver-General Laurence Curtis ran for re-election to a second term but was defeated by Democratic former Treasurer Francis E. Kelly. This was a re-match of the 1946 election.

The Prohibition Party nominated Harold J. Ireland, and the Socialist Labor party nominated Malcolm T. Rowe.

Auditor
Incumbent Democratic Auditor Thomas J. Buckley ran for re-election to a fifth term in office. He was re-elected in a landslide over Republican Russell A. Wood, who he had defeated in 1940, 1942, and 1946.

The Prohibition Party nominated Robert A. Simmons, and the Socialist Labor Party nominated Francis A. Votano.

Republican primary

General election

United States Senate 

Incumbent Republican Senator Leverett Saltonstall ran for re-election to a full term in office. Saltonstall won the seat in the 1944 special election created by Henry Cabot Lodge Jr's resignation.

United States House of Representatives

All of Massachusetts' fourteen seats in the United States House of Representatives were up for election in 1946.

Eight seats were won by Republican Party incumbents, and six were won by Democratic candidates. 

Thirteen seats were won by candidates seeking re-election. The 2nd District seat (based in Springfield) was won by Democrat Foster Furcolo over incumbent Republican Charles R. Clason.

References

External links

 
Massachusetts